Tetrasphaera veronensis is a bacterium species from the genus Tetrasphaera which has been isolated from activated sludge from Verona in Italy.

References 

Intrasporangiaceae
Bacteria described in 2006